The 2018 Wisconsin Secretary of State Election took place on November 6, 2018 to elect the Wisconsin Secretary Of State. It occurred concurrently with a Senate election in the state, elections to the state's U.S. House seats, and various other elections. Incumbent Doug La Follette who had been serving in the position since 1983 won re-election to a 10th 4-year term, defeating Republican nominee Jay Schroeder 52-47%.

Schroeder, La Follette's opponent made a pledge to abolish the position entirely if elected. This is possibly a response to the power of the office slowly being weakened ever since 1990, with more and more powers the office once had going to the legislature, other agencies, or being abolished entirely. According to analyses published by the Council of State Governments, the office is the weakest directly elected member of the National Association of Secretaries of State.

Background 
In 1974 La Follette was elected to his first term as Secretary of State. He served for one 4-year term but didn't run for re-election in order to run for lieutenant governor in 1978. He was succeeded as Secretary of State by Vel Phillips. After losing his bid for lieutenant governor La Follette primaried Phillips in 1982 and subsequently won the general election. Since then La Follette has run for re-election every cycle since then and has been re-elected every time even as the governorship and other offices at the top of the ticket went to the Republicans. Since returning to the office in 1982 power has slowly been stripped from the office and instead given to other offices. These powers include lobbying regulation and business registration which La Follette has long advocated for the return of.

Though he had won most of his re-election campaigns with ease, 2010 was his closest result since 1986 winning only by 2%. This close result can be attributed to the red wave year of 2010 which saw many big wins for Wisconsin including the ousting of popular Democratic senator Russ Feingold as well as Scott Walker winning the governorship by 5% on the same ticket. La Follette was able to improve on his margin in 2014 winning by 4% under similar circumstances as the 2010 election but was still a notable decrease based on the results he got in the past. The 2018 elections were expected to be a year that was very favorable for Democrats, making La Follette a favorite going into it.

Democratic Primary 
Incumbent Doug La Follette was challenged from the left by Arvina Martin, a member of Madison Common Council. La Follette won the primary decisively getting 65% of the vote, notably carrying all counties including Dane County home to Madison which both candidates are from.

Nominated 
 Doug La Follette, Incumbent Secretary of State, candidate for governor in the 2012 recall election, former state senator from the 22nd district

Eliminated in primary 
 Arvina Martin, member of the Madison Common Council

Results

Republican Primary

Nominated 
 Jay Harvey Schroeder

Eliminated in primary 
 Spencer Zimmerman, perennial candidate

Results

General election

Predictions

With La Follette holding the position for so long the race was seen to be not very competitive. In the end, La Follette won by 5 percentage points leading the statewide Democratic ticket.

Results

See also 
2018 Wisconsin elections
2018 United States elections

References

Wisconsin
Secretary of State
Wisconsin Secretary of State elections